The 2014 United States Senate election in Virginia was held on November 4, 2014, to elect a member of the United States Senate to represent the Commonwealth of Virginia, concurrently with other elections to the United States Senate, elections to the United States House of Representatives, and various state and local elections.

Incumbent Democratic Senator Mark Warner ran for re-election to a second term. He was unopposed for the Democratic nomination. The Republicans nominated lobbyist and former chairman of the Republican National Committee Ed Gillespie. Also running was Libertarian nominee Robert Sarvis, an attorney and businessman.

Prior to the election, most forecasters considered Virginia's 2014 senate race to be uncompetitive as polling showed Warner with a significant lead over Ed Gillespie and he was cited as having many inherent advantages such as incumbency, name recognition, and fundraising. Despite this, the race was much closer than expected, with Warner narrowly winning by a margin of just 0.8% and 17,727 votes. Gillespie conceded the race on November 7, 2014.

Warner's very narrow margin of victory made this the closest race of the 2014 Senate election cycle. Additionally, it is the last time Loudoun County has voted for the Republican candidate in a statewide election, and the last time Alleghany County has voted for the Democratic candidate in a statewide election.

Background 
Businessman Mark Warner first ran for the U.S. Senate in 1996, losing to incumbent Republican John Warner (no relation), but by a closer than expected margin, 53% to 47%. He then ran for Governor of Virginia in 2001, winning with 52% of the vote. After John Warner declined to run for a sixth term in 2008, Mark Warner ran to succeed him. Unopposed in the Democratic primary, he defeated the Republican nominee, fellow former governor Jim Gilmore, in a landslide, 65% to 34%.

Warner was widely expected to run for the Democratic nomination in the 2008 presidential election, but declined to do so, and also declined to be considered as a vice-presidential candidate. He considered running for governor again in 2013 but decided against it, and ran for re-election to a second term. Opinion polls consistently ranked Warner as the most popular elected officials in Virginia, with an approval rating consistently in the mid-60s. This, combined with his large campaign war chest, meant that he was widely dubbed "unbeatable".

Democratic primary 
Warner was unopposed for the Democratic nomination.

Candidates

Declared 
 Mark Warner, incumbent U.S. Senator

Endorsements

Republican convention 
The Republican Party of Virginia's governing body voted in May 2013 to select its 2014 U.S. Senate nominee at a convention. The convention was held on June 7, 2014, in Roanoke, Virginia.

Candidates

Results 
Ed Gillespie and Shak Hill were the main players at the convention. A 50% majority was required to receive the nomination; if no candidate achieved such a majority, voting would move to a second or third round. Results of the first ballot of voting were announced as they were finalized by congressional district, and after it became clear that Gillespie was going to win (he had about 60% of the vote with about 90% counted), Hill conceded the race and motioned to nominate Gillespie by acclamation, asking his supporters to support Gillespie. Gillespie was then nominated by acclamation.

Declared 
 Tony DeTora, congressional policy adviser
 Ed Gillespie, lobbyist and former chairman of the Republican National Committee
 Shak Hill, retired Air Force pilot and businessman
 Chuck Moss, businessman

Withdrew 
 Howie Lind, former navy commander and former chairman of Virginia's 10th congressional district Republican committee

Declined 
 Bill Bolling, former lieutenant governor of Virginia
 Jerry Boykin, retired lieutenant general and executive vice president of the Family Research Council
 Liz Cheney, attorney, political commentator, and daughter of Dick Cheney (ran for senate in Wyoming)
 Ben Cline, state delegate
 Barbara Comstock, state delegate (ran for VA-10)
 Ken Cuccinelli, former attorney general of Virginia and nominee for governor in 2013
 Artur Davis, former Democratic U.S. Representative from Alabama
 Michael Farris, founder of Patrick Henry College, the Home School Legal Defense Association and nominee for lieutenant governor in 1993
 Randy Forbes, U.S. Representative
 Newt Gingrich, former Speaker of the United States House of Representatives and candidate for President of the United States in 2012
 E.W. Jackson, pastor, conservative activist, small business lawyer, Marine Corps Veteran, candidate for the U.S. Senate in 2012 and nominee for lieutenant governor in 2013
 Bob McDonnell, former governor of Virginia and former attorney general of Virginia (ineligible due to felony convictions for bribery and corruption)
 Bob Marshall, state delegate and candidate for the United States Senate in 2008 and 2012
 Jeff McWaters, state senator
 Pete Snyder, technology executive and candidate for lieutenant governor in 2013
 Susan Stimpson, chairwoman of the Stafford County Board of Supervisors

Endorsements

Libertarian convention 
The Libertarian Party of Virginia held its convention on February 8, 2014. The delegates at the convention nominated Robert Sarvis as the Party's candidate for the U.S. Senate. Sarvis received notification from the Virginia State Board of Elections that he had achieved statewide ballot access on June 26, 2014.

Candidates

Declared 
 Robert Sarvis, attorney, businessman and nominee for governor in 2013

Endorsements

Write-in

Candidates

Declared 
 Brad Froman (write-in), businessman

General election

Fundraising

Top contributors 
According to OpenSecrets.org, Democrat Mark Warner's top five contributors are JPMorgan Chase, Dominion Resources, Altria Group, Norfolk Southern, and The Blackstone Group. Republican Ed Gillespie's top five contributors are BlueCross/BlueShield, BGR Group, The Blackstone Group, Jennmar Corporation, and the Altria Group. Thus, Warner and Gillespie share the Altria Group and the Blackstone Group as top five contributors. Libertarian Robert Sarvis is primarily funded through self-financing and individual contributions.

Third quarter reports 
After third quarter reports, the last before the election, Warner raised an additional $2 million. Gillespie pulled various television ads, stating "he does not have the financial resources" to match Warner.

Outside spending 
In the debates, Warner said, "I think we ought to get rid of all Super PACs and all outside money." However, throughout the campaign, Super PACs supported Warner while no comparable Super PAC backed Gillespie. According to the Virginia Public Access Project, as of October 23, outside groups spent $2,571,319 to influence the election.

Campaign finance reports

Cost per vote 
Warner spent $18,105,322 for the election and received 1,073,667 votes at $16.86 per vote. Gillespie spent $7,873,079 during the campaign and received 1,055,940 votes at $7.46 per vote. Sarvis spent $84,949 and received 53,102 votes at $1.60 per vote.

Debates and forums 
Democrat Mark Warner and Republican Ed Gillespie agreed to three debates and six forums. Gillespie also agreed to three additional debates, but Warner declined. Libertarian Robert Sarvis, who submitted a petition with over 1,000 signatures to debate organizers, challenged Warner and Gillespie to include him in the debates. In August, Warner accepted the challenge and requested that Sarvis be invited to the remaining debates; Gillespie did not respond. In the end, Sarvis was not invited to any of the debates and was only invited to one joint appearance.

Confirmed debates 
Virginia Bar Association
The Virginia Bar Association (VBA) debate occurred at 11 a.m. on July 26 at The Greenbrier in White Sulphur Springs, West Virginia. PBS NewsHour co-anchor Judy Woodruff moderated the debate, which was free and open to public. The VBA decided to invite only Warner and Gillespie. VBA president John L. Walker III said: "They are the only candidates who qualify under our criteria for invitations." In response to not being invited, Sarvis said, "Virginia voters lost". In addition, some political observers, like the Franklin Center for Government and Public Integrity's project watchdog.org, noted that issues like surveillance and cronyism were missing from the debate. Fewer than 800 people watched the debate on PBS' livestream, which was characterised by Politico as civil, with both candidates "at their best". The debate was later replayed multiple times on C-SPAN.
 Complete video of debate

Fairfax Chamber of Commerce
The Fairfax County Chamber of Commerce hosted a debate on October 7. The debate was moderated by Chuck Todd, the host of "Meet the Press." The debate was broadcast live on WRC-TV in Northern Virginia, and was offered to all NBC affiliates in Virginia. In their second debate, Warner and Gillespie aired their differences on marriage equality, the Affordable Care Act, and America's foreign policy challenges. Both candidates appeared uncomfortable at times. Gillespie lashed out against Warner for voting with President Barack Obama "97 percent of the time"; Warner fired back, calling it a "bogus charge". Sarvis was not invited.
 Complete video of debate

The People's Debate
The League of Women Voters of Virginia and American Association of Retired Persons of Virginia hosted "The People's Debate" on October 13 in Richmond, Virginia. The debate was offered by WTVR-TV (CBS) and WCVE-TV (Virginia Public Television) to all of their affiliates. In the third and final debate, the candidates discussed the economy, education, Social Security, healthcare, and campaign finance reform. The debate was heated at times, particularly when Warner spoke against Gillespie's past lobbying experience; Gillespie focused on Warner's recent admission that he called State Senator Phillip Puckett and spoke about jobs for Puckett's daughter. Sarvis was not invited to the debate. Sarvis described the debate as the "no people's debate" because he was "the only candidate not bought and paid for by corporate interests."

Confirmed forums 
Arlington Civic Federation
The Arlington County Civic Federation hosted a forum at 7:30pm on September 2 at Virginia Hospital Center's Hazel Auditorium in Arlington, Virginia. The event was recorded and televised by Arlington Independent Media. More than one hundred people attended the Arlington forum. Sarvis participated in the event; Warner and Gillespie declined.

Northern Virginia Technology Council
The Northern Virginia Technology Council and Microsoft co-hosted a forum, at the Microsoft Offices in Reston, Virginia, from 8 a.m. to 10:30 a.m. on September 8. The forum delved into details about cybersecurity policy, immigration visas for skilled workers and other issues important to the tech community. Warner and Gillespie participated; Sarvis was not invited.

The Battleground
The Battleground Forum with Northern Virginia Chambers of Commerce occurred between 11 a.m. and 2 p.m. on September 19 at the Center for Innovative Technology in Herndon, Virginia. The debate-style forum was hosted by chambers of commerce from Loudoun, Prince William, Reston and Fredericksburg. Questions included: the Affordable Care Act, balancing the budget, the Marketplace Fairness Act, Virginia's economy and student loan debt. Warner's and Gillespie's answers centered around two themes: Warner speaking about his bipartisanship record and Gillespie pairing Warner with President Barack Obama. Sarvis was not invited.

Roanoke Chamber of Commerce
The Roanoke Chamber of Commerce joint appearance occurred between 11:30 a.m. and 1:00 p.m., at the City Market Building in Roanoke, Virginia, on October 6. The forum was moderated by Dr. Robert "Bob" Denton, who leads the communication department at Virginia Tech. Warner, Gillespie, and Sarvis were invited. Warner highlighted his record of bipartisanship; Gillespie questioned whether Warner is really the centrist he claims to be; and Sarvis argued the two-party system is broken and neither of his opponents offers any meaningful change. The forum covered a variety of issues, including transportation funding, immigration reform and foreign policy, and a question about the Affordable Care Act highlighted the candidates' differences.

Sorensen Institute
The Sorensen Institute for Political Leadership, Danville Register & Bee, and WSET-TV joint appearance occurred October 14 at 7 p.m. in Danville, Virginia. Warner and Gillespie participated. Sarvis was not invited.

Christopher Newport University
The Christopher Newport University joint appearance took place on October 17 in Gaines Theater in Hampton Roads, Virginia. Warner and Gillespie answered questions from Dr. Quentin Kidd, a government professor and director of Christopher Newport University's Wason Center. The event was free and open to the public. Warner and Gillespie attended. Sarvis was not invited.

Central Business District Association
The Central Business District Association joint appearance was at The Westin Virginia Beach Town Center, from 8:00 a.m. to 9:30 a.m. on October 23. Warner and Gillespie participated. Sarvis was not invited.

Proposed debates

Predictions

Polling 

With Allen

With Bolling

With Cantor

With Comstock

With Cuccinelli

With Kristol

With Lind

With Marshall

With McDonnell

With Obenshain

Results

See also 
 2014 United States Senate elections
 2014 United States elections
 2014 United States House of Representatives elections in Virginia

References

External links 
 U.S. Senate elections in Virginia, 2014 at Ballotpedia
 Campaign contributions at OpenSecrets
Official campaign websites
 Mark Warner for U.S. Senate incumbent
 Ed Gillespie for U.S. Senate
 Robert Sarvis for U.S. Senate
 Brad Froman for U.S. Senate

Virginia
2014
United States Senate
Mark Warner